Top Gear is a British television series that focuses on various motor vehicles, primarily cars, in which its hosts conduct reviews on new models and vintage classics, as well as tackling various motoring related challenges, and inviting celebrities to set a time on their specially designed race-course. The programme is a relaunched version of the original 1977 show of the same name. 

For its first series, the show was presented by Jeremy Clarkson, Richard Hammond, and Jason Dawe, with support from an anonymous race driver, The Stig. The format of the first series was more similar to the original show than later series and had interviews with guests outside of the Star in a Reasonably Priced Car segment. Dawe was replaced by James May for the second series, where the show chose to focus only on car reviews, guest laps in the Reasonably Priced Car, the Cool Wall, and the Greatest Car Ever segment (exclusive to this series), with each episode also having a single short challenge. This strict format was later relaxed, with the third series showing more challenges; these challenges became longer from the fourth series as the races and the cheap car challenges were introduced. By series 7, there were fewer reviews of "affordable" cars that were the main focus of the original show, and the show became almost entirely focused on longer and partially-scripted challenges, with one or two car reviews (usually only featuring performance cars) per episode. Regular roadtrip-style special episodes were also introduced from series 9, often aired as a Christmas special.

This new format remained unchanged until the line-up was changed after the departure of Clarkson, Hammond and May at the end of the twenty-second series. Chris Evans and Matt LeBlanc took over as the main hosts, with a team of co-presenters consisting of Chris Harris, Rory Reid, Eddie Jordan and Sabine Schmitz. After the twenty-third series, Evans departed from the show, leading to LeBlanc being joined by Harris and Reid as the main hosts, with occasional appearances from Jordan and Schmitz. LeBlanc departed the show following the twenty-sixth series in 2019, and was replaced by new hosts Paddy McGuiness and Freddie Flintoff for the twenty-seventh series later that year.

The following is a list of episodes, listed in order of their original UK air date along with featured cars, challenges, and guests. For more information on features and challenges included in each series, visit each series' respective page. Comprehensive lists of challenges and races can be found at Top Gear challenges and Top Gear Races. The list does not include shorter spin-off episodes produced for charity (Top Gear of the Pops, produced for Red Nose Day; Top Ground Gear Force and Stars in Fast Cars, produced for Sport Relief; and an Ashes to Ashes parody and Children in Need does Star in a Reasonably Priced Car for Children in Need), 'Best of' special episodes, and some other specials, such as 50 Years of Bond Cars, An Evening with Top Gear, and A Tribute To Sabine Schmitz.

Series overview

Episodes

Series 1 (2002)

Series 2 (2003)

Series 3 (2003)

Series 4 (2004)

Series 5 (2004)

Series 6 (2005)

Series 7 (2005–06)

Series 8 (2006)

Series 9 (2007)

Special (2007)

Series 10 (2007)

Series 11 (2008)

Series 12 (2008)

Series 13 (2009)

Series 14 (2009–10)

Series 15 (2010)

Series 16 (2010–11)

Series 17 (2011)

Series 18 (2011–12)

Series 19 (2013)

Series 20 (2013)

Series 21 (2014)

Series 22 (2014–15)

Specials (2015)
In November 2015, the BBC announced "Top Gear: From A-Z", described as a "two-part extravaganza" in the form of a clip show composed of material from the previous twenty-two series of Top Gear. It is narrated by comedian John Bishop with celebrities presenting their favourite highlights from the show; the programme did not use the Top Gear studio.

Series 23 (2016)

Series 24 (2017)

Series 25 (2018)

Series 26 (2019)

Series 27 (2019)

Series 28 (2019–20)

Series 29 (2020)

Series 30 (2021)

Series 31 (2021)

Series 32 (2022)

Series 33 (2022)

Ratings

Notes

References

Episodes
Lists of British non-fiction television series episodes